Erik Gilissen (born 19 September 1968) is a Belgian-Flemish politician for Vlaams Belang.

Gilissen worked as an IT manager and a software developer for company in Heusden. He has been a municipal councilor in Beringen for Vlaams Belang since January 2019. In the 2019 federal elections, Gilissen was also elected to the Chamber of Representatives from third place on the Limburg VB list.

References 

Living people
21st-century Belgian politicians
1968 births
Vlaams Belang politicians
Members of the Belgian Federal Parliament
Flemish politicians
People from Bilzen